Abdulai Ibrahim (born 6 March 1999) is a Ghanaian professional footballer who plays as a defender for Ghanaian Premier League side Dreams F.C.

Career 
In January 2019, Ibrahim joined Ghana Premier League side Dreams FC. He made his debut during the 2019 GFA Normalization Committee Special Competition. On 14 April 2018, he made his debut and played the full 90 minutes in a 1–1 draw against West African Football Academy (WAFA), in the process he scored his debut goal to help them salvage the draw. He played 4 matches and scored 1 goal at the end of the competition. He played 10 matches during the 2019–20 Ghana Premier League season before the league was truncated due to the COVID-19 pandemic. Ahead of the 2020–21 Ghana Premier League season, he was named on the team's squad list as the league was set to restart in November 2020.

References

External links 
 

Living people
1999 births
Association football defenders
Ghanaian footballers
Dreams F.C. (Ghana) players
Ghana Premier League players